Paladilhia pleurotoma is a species of freshwater snail in the family Moitessieriidae.

It is endemic to France. This snail lives in underground water bodies. It is not of immediate conservation concern but it could be threatened by water pollution and overexploitation of aquifers.

References

 Girardi H. (2009) Contribution à l'étude des Gastéropodes stygobies de France. 4- Paladilhia pleurotoma Bourguignat, 1865 (Mollusca: Caenogastropoda: Moitessieriidae), dans les départements du Gard et de l'Hérault. Documents Malacologiques Hors série, 3: 127–134.

Moitessieriidae
Endemic molluscs of Metropolitan France
Gastropods described in 1865
Taxonomy articles created by Polbot